ARC21 is a local government body that is tasked with coordination of the waste management and recycling services in the North East of Northern Ireland. 

The ARC21 waste management region includes the city, borough and district councils of:
Antrim
Ards
Ballymena
Belfast
Carrickfergus
Castlereagh
Down
Larne
Lisburn
Newtownabbey
North Down

ARC21 is accountable to the Northern Ireland Department for the Environment.

See also
North West Region Waste Management Group
Southern Waste Management Partnership

References

Waste disposal authorities